Fort Hunt High School was a public secondary school near Alexandria, Virginia from 1963 until 1985, when it was converted to a middle school.

Constructed at a cost of $2.5 million, Fort Hunt High opened its doors at 8428 Fort Hunt Road in 1963, toward the end of the post–World War II baby boom, as part of the Fairfax County Public Schools.

The school suffered $4.5 million in fire damage as the result of arson on December 30, 1978, when two seniors at the school and a 1978 graduate threw Molotov cocktails into the building. The fire resulted in the forced relocation of 1,700 students who were sent on a split shift to nearby Groveton and Mount Vernon High schools through the remainder of the 1978–79 school year.

In 1985, due to declining enrollment, and after contentious political and legal battles to keep the school open, Fort Hunt was combined with Groveton High School to form West Potomac High School, located on Groveton's campus. The Fort Hunt campus was converted into Carl Sandburg Middle School, which replaced the older Stephen Foster and Bryant Intermediate Schools.

A large community of Fort Hunt High School alumni remains active online, organizing regular all-school and all-year reunion gatherings, and granting annual scholarships to graduating seniors of West Potomac High School.

School institutions 
The yearbook was called The Fortress. The school paper was called The Frontline. The athletic teams were called the Federals.

Notable alumni
Robert C. Michelson, '69 — American engineer and academic Recipient of the Pirelli Award for the diffusion of scientific culture,  and the first €25,000 Top Pirelli Prize
Rick Atkinson, '70 — Pulitzer Prize winning author
Carl C. Perkins, '72 — member of the United States House of Representatives from Kentucky's 7th congressional district, 1983–1993
Admiral James A. Winnefeld, Jr., "Sandy", '74 — Vice Chairman of the Joint Chiefs of Staff, Aug. 4, 2011 – July 31, 2015
Phoef Sutton, '76 — Emmy Award-winning TV writer/producer of Cheers
Wendy B. Lawrence, '77 — NASA astronaut
Rocky Belk, '79 — NFL player
Carolyn Cole, '79 — Pulitzer Prize winning photographer
Jacqueline Novogratz '79 — founder of Acumen
Robert Novogratz '81 — real estate investor,  designer, and television host on HGTV and Bravo
Hoda Kotb, '82 — co-host of the NBC's Today
Michael Novogratz '84 — investor and CEO of Galaxy Investment Partners.

References

High schools in Fairfax County, Virginia
Educational institutions established in 1963
Educational institutions disestablished in 1985
Defunct schools in Virginia
School buildings in the United States destroyed by arson
1963 establishments in Virginia